Justin Edward Bishop (born 4 January 1982) is an English cricketer. Bishop is a left-handed batsman and a left-arm medium-fast bowler.

Born in Bury St. Edmunds, Bishop attended County Upper School followed by Durham University. He played 25 first-class games for Essex from 1999 to 2005.  Having first represented Essex in August 1999 in the CGU National League, he would later appear throughout the Division Two seasons of 1999–2002, before Essex's promotion into the First Division, playing in 23 List A one-day games in all.  He made 4 first-class fifties and took 57 wickets in all.

Bishop has since participated in the Minor Counties Championship Eastern Division for Suffolk, making his debut against Cumberland on 7 August 2005.

References

External links
Justin Bishop at ESPNcricinfo
Justin Bishop at CricketArchive

1982 births
Living people
Sportspeople from Bury St Edmunds
English cricketers
Essex cricketers
Suffolk cricketers
Durham MCCU cricketers
British Universities cricketers
Alumni of John Snow College, Durham